Saint-Lambert-de-Lauzon Aerodrome  is located  southeast of Saint-Lambert-de-Lauzon, Quebec, Canada.

References

Registered aerodromes in Chaudière-Appalaches